Engelholm is a manor house and estate located four kilometres northwest of Præstø, in Næstved Municipality, some 60 kilometres south of Copenhagen, Denmark. It has been owned by members of the Wolf/Wolff-Sneedorf family since 1830. The main building was listed on the Danish registry of protected buildings and places by the Danish Heritage Agency in 1918.

History

Petersen family

Engelholm was created when the former Vordingborg Cavalry District (Vordingborg Ryttergods) was divided into 12 estates and sold by the crown in the middle of the 1770s. One of them, until then known as Skovbygaard, was sold to Hans Petersen, a local master butcher. He had previously been indicted for charging double prices for all deliveries to queen dowager Juliane Marie's household but was acquitted due to lack of evidence. He was able to buy the estate after marrying the wealthy widow of a miller in 1773. She was called Inger Engel, and Hans Petersen named the estate after her. Hans Petersen completed a new main building on the estate in 1785, and prior to that had also improved the farm buildings. Their son Peter Benedict Petersen took over the estate after his father in 1803. The manor fell into neglect during the crisis years of the 1800s and 1810s.

Ludvig Georg Cøln and state-ownership, 18251830
In 1825,  Peter Petersen's heirs sold Engelholm to Ludvig Georg Cøln. He was also hit by economic difficulties and the estate therefore entered administration by the Treasury (Rentekammeret) in 1827. By 1830, Cøln with his wife, two of their children, a maid and two lodgers in a first floor apartment in Møntergade in Copenhagen.

Wolff family

In 1830, the Treasury sold Engelholm to Benjamin Wolff. He had studied law at the University of Copenhagen before travelling to Calcutta, where he was employed by the trading house Cruttenden, Mackillop & Co., of which he later became a partner before returning to Denmark as a wealthy man in 1829. In 1832, he married Julie Sneedorff. They kept a large household at Engelholm. Their guests included Bertel Thorvaldsen and Adam Oehlenschläger. Wolf was an amateur painter and had also built a collection of local drawings and watercolours in India which he supplemented with Danish works after his return to the country. In 1855, Wolf also purchased the estate Grevensvænge.

Wolf's eldest son, Hans Christian Theodor Wolf, who had served as a military officer in the Second Schleswig War, inherited the Engelholm in 1866. He and his brother Germer Wolf changed their last name to Wolff-Sneedorrf the following year in accordance with a wish made by their father in his will. Hans Christian Theodor Wolff-Sneedorrf was also bank manager of the local savings bank in Præstø. None of his sons outlived him and in 1906 he chose to cede Engelholm to his brother, who had already inherited Grevensvænge after their mother's death in 1875. Germer Wolff-Sneedorrf was a military officer with rank of rittmeister and chamberlain. He passed Engelholm on to his son Knud Wolff-Sneedorf in 1925.

Architecture
The main building is from 1781–85. It is an 11 bay long, one-storey building with Mansard roof and a two-storey, three-bay avant corps on both sides. The building is rendered yellow with white details. A staircase with Rococo railing in the vestibule connects the two floors. The ceiling in the music room features a gilded rosette.

The main building was listed on the Danish registry of protected buildings and places by the Danish Heritage Agency on 2 July 1918.

Surroundings
Peter Benedict Hansen created an English style landscape garden to the east of the house. It was later redesigned by the landscape architect rik August Flindt in the 1780s. The garden contains the grave of Hans Petersen as well as a family tomb for the Wolff-Sneedorf family.

Today
An old storage building was renovated in 2011 as part of Realdania's Fremtidens Herregårde (Manor houses of the Future) programme. It is now used as a workshop and meeting place for people with vintage cars as well as a venue for meetings and events.

List of owners
       -1775: Kronen (Vordingborg Rytterdistrikt)
 1775-1803: Hans Petersen
 1803-1824: Peter Benedict Petersen
 1824-1825: The estate after Peter Benedict Petersen
 1825-1827: Ludvig Georg Cøln
 1827-1830: Rentekammeret
 1830-1866: Benjamin Wolff
 1866-1906: Hans Christian Theodor Wolff-Sneedorf
 1906-1925: Gerner Wolff-Sneedorf
 1925-1956: Knud Wolff-Sneedorf
 1956-1976: Aage Wolff-Sneedorf
 1976-present: Gerner Wolff-Sneedorf

References

Rxternal links
 Source

Listed buildings and structures in Faxe Municipality
Manor houses in Næstved Municipality
1773 establishments in Denmark